Manuel Arturo Villalobos Salvo (born October 15, 1980) is a Chilean former footballer and current manager.

Playing career

Villalobos joined Colo-Colo's youth squad at the age of ten in 1990. In 1997, he made his professional debut.  In 2000, he was loaned to Fernández Vial to gain more playing time and experience.  During his time with Fernández Vial he was the second leading scorer of the Primera B (Chilean Second Division).  After his impressive season Villalobos was loaned six months to Primera División (Chilean First Division) squad O'Higgins.  He then spent the next six months with Deportes Talcahuano.  During these two years Villalobos was rejected a chance to return to his original club, Colo-Colo.  In 2002 Colo-Colo's coach Jaime Pizarro released him from his contract due to indiscipline.

In 2002 Villalobos signed with Deportes Iquique.  The following year Villalobos signed with Portuguese club S.C. Dragões Sandinenses, where he was primarily used as a reserve.  The following two years Villalobos spent in the Chilean Third Division where he scored in abundance. However since he was not owned by any first-tier club, his accomplishments were not taken seriously. During this time he thought about leaving football for good.

Ñublense, another third division squad, signed Villalobos.  Ñublense quickly gained promotion to the Primera B and Villalobos began to regain his interest in football.  At the end of the 2006, with Villalobos as the team's top goal scorer and team captain, Ñublense was promoted to the Primera División. In the 2007 Clausura tournament, Villalobos was the second leading scorer of the competition with 13 goals. His good form led Universidad de Chile (Colo-Colo's rival) to sign him to a 2-year contract at the beginning of 2008. Villalobos has said in interviews he hopes to score many goals against Colo-Colo.  In the January pre-season matches, Villalobos scored in almost every game. In the 2008 Apertura tournament Villalobos has scored four goals in the first six games. On January 11 he signed  a 1-year contract with Huachipato of Chile.

Villalobos played for Chile at the 1997 FIFA U-17 World Championship in Egypt.

Coaching career
Since 2022, he works as coach of the Deportes Iquique youth ranks. In April and October of the same year he has assumed as caretaker coach of the first team.

Honours

Club
 Colo-Colo
 Primera División de Chile (1): 1998

 Universidad de Chile
Primera División de Chile (1): 2009 Apertura

Huachipato
 Primera División de Chile (1): 2012 Clausura

Deportes Iquique
Copa Chile (1): 2013–14

References

External links
 
 
 Manuel Villalobos at MemoriaWanderers 

1980 births
Living people
People from Iquique
Chilean footballers
Chile international footballers
Chile youth international footballers
Colo-Colo footballers
C.D. Arturo Fernández Vial footballers
O'Higgins F.C. footballers
Naval de Talcahuano footballers
Deportes Iquique footballers
S.C. Dragões Sandinenses players
San Marcos de Arica footballers
Deportes Copiapó footballers
Ñublense footballers
Universidad de Chile footballers
C.D. Huachipato footballers
Santiago Wanderers footballers
Chilean Primera División players
Primera B de Chile players
Segunda Divisão players
Chilean expatriate footballers
Chilean expatriate sportspeople in Portugal
Expatriate footballers in Portugal
Association football forwards
Chilean football managers
Deportes Iquique managers
Primera B de Chile managers